A list of the published work of Nelson Algren, American writer.

Books
Somebody in Boots (1935)
Never Come Morning (1942)
The Neon Wilderness (1947), a collection of short stories
The Man with the Golden Arm (1949), concerns morphine addiction
Chicago: City on the Make (1951)
A Walk on the Wild Side (1956)
Nelson Algren's Own Book of Lonesome Monsters (1962)
Who Lost an American? (1963)
Conversations with Nelson Algren (1964)
Notes from a Sea Diary: Hemingway All the Way (1965)
The Last Carousel (1973)
The Devil's Stocking (1983)
America Eats (1992)
He Swung and He Missed (1993)
The Texas Stories of Nelson Algren (1994)
Nonconformity (1996)
Notes From a Sea Diary & Who Lost an American (Seven Stories Press, 2009)

Short fiction 

Bibliographies by writer
Bibliographies of American writers